Alonsoa (mask flower) is a genus of 12 species of flowering plants in the family Scrophulariaceae. The genus includes both herbaceous and shrubby species.

The genus is native to Central and western South America, from Mexico south to Peru and Chile. At least two species are native to South Africa. Alonsoas grow to around 30–100 cm tall, and have small, broadly oval, serrated leaves. The red, orange, yellow, white or occasionally blue flowers are borne on a loose terminal raceme.

The alonsoa is named for Zenón de Alonso Acosta, a Spanish official in Bogota.

Species 
 Alonsoa acutifolia 
 Alonsoa albiflora 
 Alonsoa auriculata 
 Alonsoa caulialata 
 Alonsoa hirsuta  
 Alonsoa honoraria 
 Alonsoa linearis 
 Alonsoa meridionalis 
 Alonsoa minor 
 Alonsoa pallida 
 Alonsoa peduncularis 
 Alonsoa quadrifolia 
 Alonsoa serrata

References

External links 
 
 Alonsoa meridionalis pictures growing in Chile

Scrophulariaceae
Scrophulariaceae genera